Wright Investors' Service Holdings, Inc., formerly National Patent Development Corporation, is a United States company (a Delaware corporation headquartered in Mount Kisco, New York) which is primarily a shell company. 

National Patent Development Corporation (NPD) was incorporated in Delaware in 1959 by three New York City lawyers, Jerome Feldman, Martin M. Pollak, and Jess Larson.

In 1961 Feldman and Pollak wrote a letter to Nikita Khrushchev proposing to buy US rights to inventions made in the USSR. The Soviet leadership agreed to cooperate and after three weeks in the USSR, NPD experts conferred with around 250 Soviet specialists and ultimately won patent rights to 14 inventions to be marketed in the United States by signing an agreement with Amtorg.

Using their Soviet connections, NPD then made inquiries in other Eastern bloc countries. In Czechoslovakia they met Otto Wichterle, the inventor of modern soft contact lenses. Then NPD bought the American rights to produce the lenses and sublicensed them to Bausch & Lomb which started to manufacture them in the USA.

On December 19, 2012, NPD completed the merger of a wholly owned subsidiary of the Company with and into The Winthrop Corporation.

In 2013 NPD changed the name to Wright Investors` Service Holdings, Inc.

On July 17, 2018, Wright Investors’ Service Holdings, Inc. (WISH) sold 100% of the issued and outstanding common stock of The Winthrop Corporation (Winthrop), a wholly owned subsidiary of WISH, to Khandwala Capital Management, Inc.  Winthrop, through its wholly owned subsidiary Wright Investors' Service, Inc., is an investment management and financial advisory firm.

References

External links
History of National Patent Development Corporation 
National Patent Development Corporation Changes Name to Wright Investors` Service Holdings, Inc.
National Patent Development Corporation

Patent monetization companies of the United States
Investment management companies of the United States
Financial services companies established in 1959